= Amar Pizza =

Pizzeria in the U.S. state of Michigan

- Interactive map of Amar Pizza

Restaurant information
- Food type: Pizza
- Location: Hamtramck; Troy, Michigan, United States
- Coordinates: 42°24′22.0″N 83°03′52.1″W

Amar Pizza is a pizzeria in Hamtramck and Troy, in the U.S. state of Michigan. In 2024, the business was included in The New York Times's list of the 22 best pizzerias in the U.S.
